Adolf Karl Friedrich Ludwig Prinz zu Hohenlohe-Ingelfingen (29 January 1797 – 24 April 1873) was a Prussian nobleman, soldier, and politician. He briefly served as Minister-President of Prussia in 1862 and was succeeded by Otto von Bismarck.

Marriage and issue 
On 19 April 1819, Prince Adolf married Princess Louise of Hohenlohe-Langenburg, daughter of Prince Karl Ludwig of Hohenlohe-Langenburg. They had the following children:
 Carl (1820 – 1890)
 Friedrich Wilhelm (1826 – 1895)
 Kraft (1827 – 1892)
 Adelheid (b. 1830)
 Luise (1835 – 1913)

Notes 

1797 births
1873 deaths
Nobility from Wrocław
German princes
Members of the Prussian House of Lords
Prime Ministers of Prussia
People from the Province of Silesia
House of Hohenlohe-Ingelfingen
Prussian princes
Generals of Cavalry (Prussia)